Priyank M. Kharge (born 22 November 1978) is an Indian politician representing the Indian National Congress. He is currently serving as a Member of Legislative Assembly (MLA) from Chittapur Assembly Constituency in Kalaburagi District of Karnataka for the second time. In 2016, at the age of 38, he became the youngest minister to be sworn in to the then Chief Minister Siddaramaiah’s cabinet as the Minister of IT, BT & Tourism. He has also served as a Cabinet Minister of Social Welfare in the coalition Government headed by H D Kumaraswamy.

Personal life 
He is the son of Mallikarjun Kharge, the leader of opposition in Rajya Sabha. He is married to Shruti Kharge. Priyank Kharge is an Ambedkarite and a Buddhist.

Early life and career
Born in Bengaluru, Kharge is a professional in Design (Graphics & Animation) and has worked extensively for corporations in India & abroad. He is a keen observer of technology and has co-founded a few startups that have broken new ground in GIS-based solutions, mobile technologies and creating original IP for animation studios.

Early political career
Kharge entered politics as an activist of the National Students' Union of India in 1998. 
1999 – NSUI College General Secretary 
2001 – 2005: State NSUI General Secretary
2005-2007: Karnataka Pradesh Youth Congress Secretary
2007 – 2011: Karnataka Pradesh Youth Congress General Secretary
2011 - 2014: Elected as Vice President of Karnataka Pradesh Youth Congress

He entered electoral politics by contesting from Chittapur in the 2009 Karnataka Assembly by-election but was defeated by Valmiki Nayak of Bharatiya Janata Party. In 2013, he won the Karnataka Assembly election and was made the IT and BT minister in 2016 under the Siddaramaiah-led Congress Government. In 2018, he again won from Chittapur and was made the Social Welfare Minister under H.D.Kumarswamy led Congress – JD(S) Coalition Government.

Ministry
Priyank is known for his practical and out-of-the-box thinking. During his tenures as minister for Social Welfare, IT & Tourism, he is known to have initiated reforms and schemes that have changed the landscape of the Departments and have also empowered the people.

As the Social Welfare Minister
As a man of firsts, he implemented several schemes for the socially & economically disempowered people to fill the gaps in the sectors such as education, health, drinking water, agro-horticultural productivity, social security net etc.

Airavata
The Govt. partnered with the ride-hailing company Ola, Uber and other taxi service providers as part of this new self-employment scheme. Aimed at SC/ST youth, the scheme provides a financial grant of up to Rs. 5 Lakhs to youth who were keen on becoming partners with aggregators. This scheme was revolutionary as it was for the first time that the Govt. linked the beneficiaries directly to the aggregators.

Prabuddha
This initiative helped meritorious students with financial assistance to access the world’s most reputed universities and institutions to pursue their postgraduate and PhD programmes. For the first time, a State Government created a complete 360-degree scheme for students interested in pursuing higher education. This included the students’ counselling, cultural & accent training, college & research fees, travel costs, hostel charges and a host of other tools to succeed.

Pragati
For the first time, a comprehensive infrastructure model for the colonies was devised. Under the Pragati colony scheme, a one-time grant from 50 lakhs to 3 Cr could be sanctioned for providing drinking water, roads, drains, electricity, link roads, Anganwadi and other facilities.

Samruddhi
One of the most ambitious schemes aimed at creating more entrepreneurs in Tier 2/3 towns and rural areas,
Samruddhi has the potential to be the game changer not only for marginalized communities but also for retailers looking for newer markets in towns and big villages. This scheme focused on providing an opportunity for the economically weaker sections to become franchisees of established retailers. The beneficiaries are given an initial grant capital of Rs. 10 lakhs to set up shop and go through extensive training and certification processes by the retailer before they actually get down to doing real business. They become owners of businesses and employers at almost zero cost and the retailers have access to new markets at zero costs, a win-win situation for all.

Unnati
Unnati is a first-of-its-kind initiative that looked towards encouraging knowledge-based entrepreneurial initiative, with the government providing seed money of up to INR 50 Lakhs to SC/ST entrepreneurs who are pursuing technology breakthroughs in the startup arena. The program provides end-to-end requirements essential for a startup i.e. identifying the innovation, mentoring, validating the idea, providing seed capital and eventually giving them market access.
The uniqueness of Unnati is that it will also seed fund social innovations and inventions that have a major impact on the communities. Innovations in manual scavenging, waste segregation, leather products and other works associated with the communities can be adopted by the Government or funded as well.

Established the long pending Karnataka Adi Jambava Development Corporation for the Adi Jambava Community.

Initiated and set up a Committee for the Revival of LIDKAR  to ensure that the corporation can turn into a profit-making entity and also empower leather artisans and industries.

In a unique approach to ensuring tribal products reach the retail market, Priyank launched the ADAVI brand of coffee powder that was grown by the tribals of Chamarajnagar and Chickkamaglur. This ensured over 2650 tribals had a better price and brand for their unique produce.

Set up an expert committee to prepare a Hostel Policy for the improvements of infrastructure, education, sanitation and procurement for 3500 hostels & 800 residential schools.

As IT, BT & Tourism Minister

As the IT, BT & Tourism Minister, Priyank initiated various projects to uplift the startup and innovation ecosystem in the state.

ELEVATE 100
This out-of-the-box scheme helps identify the top 100 innovative startups of the state every year and helps them to get to the next level of entrepreneurship. This initiative provided seed grants of up to 50 lakhs, idea validation, networking, startup booster kit, mentorship, access to markets and also Govt projects. This is perhaps India's comprehensive startup initiative that helps entrepreneurs in all aspects.

Grand Challenges Karnataka
This scheme was accelerated to facilitate the generation of Innovative Technology solutions with a social impact in sectors like Urban Development, Health Care, Food Security, Agriculture, Clean Environment and Education. Phase-wise funding was also allocated for selected solutions in each sector, to transform an idea into a proof of concept/prototype.

To encourage entrepreneurship in educational institutions, New Age Incubation Networks (NAIN) Centres were established in 9 districts for engineering college students, alumni and local entrepreneurs. This initiative has ensured that innovation and entrepreneurship are bred at the college/university levels.

If Karnataka needs to stay ahead in the technology race, it was imperative to lead from the front and it was under the aegis of Priyank Kharge, Karnataka state started looking at being the pioneers of future technologies. 
A host of Centers of Excellence have been set up so that Bengaluru is future-ready. 
He has established Centers of Excellence in:
Internet of Things, Data Science and Artificial Intelligence
Aerospace and Defence
Cyber Security
Machine Learning and Robotics
Agri-Tech
Animation & Design
Biotechnology Skill Enhancement Program (BiSEP).

As Tourism Minister
Priyank Kharge is considered one of the most progressive Tourism Ministers for the state of Karnataka, it was under his tenure that the state saw a revival & surge of the box tourist circuits and also a slew of initiatives are bearing fruits of success to even this day. Here too, his out-of-the-box thinking helped Karnataka position itself as a unique tourist destination both nationally and internationally.

Priyank Kharge is credited with the merging of the State Archaeology Department with the Department of Tourism. This has ensured smoother operations for the Departments and has ensured that the preservation of archaeology sites and responsible tourism go hand in hand. 
Karnataka for the first time had a strategic thrust given to eco & wildlife tourism by implementing the Year of The Wild initiative which gives impetus to responsible eco, adventure and wildlife tourism.

The major achievements under this initiative were:
Jungle lodges and resorts got huge infrastructure thrust and impetus.
Along with EcoTourism Board, Green Passports were launched for the first time in the country. These passports gave access to 14 curated mountain trails and treks across the state.
India’s first National Surfing Festival was held near the beaches of Mangaluru.
Adventure sports like rock climbing in UNESCO sites of Badami and Pataddakal were held and
Asian Bouldering Championship in Hampi, UNESCO site.
Funds for the conservation of wildlife projects also were given.

Conceptualized the Karnataka International Tourism Expo -KITE which showcases the state as an international tourist destination. Besides Kerala, Karanataka is the only state that has an international expo.

To explore the untapped heritage and tourism destinations of the Kalayana Karnataka region, Hyderabad Karnataka Tourism Advisory Committee was formed. This committee gave recommendations on the preservation of archaeology sites, plan circuits and destination development to enhance the footfalls in the state.

With the ambition of making Benagaluru a global city in the true sense, Priyank formed the Bengaluru Tourism Advisory Committee which advised on making the city a global destination for tourists and transit. They also recommended city circuits, ideas to boost local economic activity to attract tourists, and conservation of the city’s art, culture, heritage and cuisine. The thrust was given to make Bengaluru the most preferred cosmopolitan tourist destination in India.

Priyank has been responsible for the identity of Bengaluru, since he commissioned the Bengaluru city logo to be crowdsourced. Selected by experts by screening thousands of entries, Bengaluru is the first city in the country to join the league of metropolises like New York, Paris, Berlin, London and others who have a logo of their own. This was the beginning of building the legacy of Brand Bengaluru to anchor tourism for the state and country.

The most successful city-driven community engagement for a metropolitan area was the brainchild of Priyank Kharge. Four Bengaluru Habbas were organized where citizens could experience the true essence of their city by indulging in arts, crafts, sports, culture, history, literature and cuisines, all this on trafficless open streets. He threw open the gates of iconic Vidhana Soudha for the public to engage with their heritage, a first of its kind for one of the events.

Puneeta Yatra was first of its kind religious tourism package, where the traveller could choose completely curated circuits of religious and holy places across the state.

For the first time, a special push was given to sports tourism and it was for the first time that Govt. tied up with the private sector to bring world-class sporting events that increased footfalls for the state. 
Indian Premier League’s Royal Challengers Bangalore partnered with Dept. of Tourism to promote Jungle Lodges & Resorts.
The Department also tied up with Bengaluru Football Club to enhance State’s presence. 
Bengaluru Golf Open was hosted for the first time with prize money of 1 Crore, making it the biggest tournament sponsored by Government in India.
Held India’s first surfing challenge and
The Kali River Rafting Challenge was held with the Dept. of Sports.

The establishment of Bengaluru Dr B. R. Ambedkar School of Economics University for Dr. B.R. Ambedkar’s 125th Birth Anniversary too is attributed to Priyank Kharge. It was his perseverance with the then CM of Karnataka, Mr Siddaramaiah, to honour the Father of The Constitution by establishing a school of economics. This has been established to help envisage economic and social policies for the nation. Priyank Kharge also served as the Co-Chairman of BASE for 2 years.

Currently, Priyank Kharge is the Chairman of IT and Data for the Karnataka Pradesh Congress Committee.
 
 As the Information Technology Minister, Kharge has introduced a Startup Booster Kit which has facilities like access to mentors, cloud credits and incubators. In 2017 he started Bengaluru Tech Summit to boost the tech industry.

External links 
 Karnataka Legislative Assembly

References 

Living people
Indian National Congress politicians from Karnataka
Indian Buddhists
1978 births
Karnataka MLAs 2013–2018
Karnataka MLAs 2018–2023